Ivanovskoye is a rural locality (a village) in Spasskoye Rural Settlement, Vologodsky District, Vologda Oblast, Russia. The population was 9 as of 2002.

Geography 
The distance to Vologda is 13 km, to Neponyatovo is 3 km. Dmitriyevskoye, Pilatovo, Yaskino and Abramtsevo are the nearest rural localities.

References 

Rural localities in Vologodsky District